Barringtonia acutangula is a species of Barringtonia native to coastal wetlands in southern Asia and northern Australasia, from Afghanistan east to the Philippines,  Queensland and the Northern Territory. Common names include freshwater mangrove, itchytree and mango-pine.

Description
This plant is a big tree that grows to about 8–15 m high. Its leaves are thick, smooth and oval in shape, about 8–12 cm long and 4–5 cm wide, with reddish petioles about 0.5–1.0 cm long. The plant has drooping raceme of up to 50 cm long, with numerous large, white flowers. Its fruit is oval-shaped and about 3 cm long, with 1 seed inside.

Uses

Food
The young leaves of this plant are consumed as food, such as in Vietnam where they are eaten fresh with other vegetables, meat and shrimp.

Medicinal
Research on this plant has reported a number of medicinal uses, including antitumor (seed extract), antibiotic, inhibition of growth of Helicobacter pylori, antinociceptive activity and antifungal activity.

The 1889 book 'The Useful Native Plants of Australia’ records that "In India an extract or juice is obtained from the leaves of this tree which, when mixed with oil, is used in native [sic.] practice for eruptions of the skin. The kernels powdered and prepared with sago and butter, are used in diarrhoea; mixed with milk they produce vomiting (Treasury of Botany). The root is bitter, and is said to be similar to Cinchona, but also cooling and aperient. (Drury)."

Chemistry
Its bark contains potent painkillers, structurally unrelated to known opioid painkillers 

Also 3,3'-dimethoxy ellagic acid, dihydromyricetin, gallic acid, bartogenic acid and stigmasterol, triterpenoids, olean-18-en-3beta-O-E-coumaroyl ester and olean-18-en-3beta-O-Z-coumaroyl ester  12, 20(29)-lupadien-3-o

Oleanane-type isomeric triterpenoids:- racemosol A (1) [22alpha-acetoxy-3beta,15alpha,16alpha,21beta-tetrahydroxy-28-(2-methylbutyryl)olean-12-ene] and isoracemosol A (2) [21beta-acetoxy-3beta,15alpha,16alpha,28-tetrahydroxy-22alpha-(2-methylbutyryl)olean-12-ene].

Saponins,: barringtoside A, 3-O-beta-D-xylopyranosyl(1-->3)-[beta-D-galactopyranosyl(1-->2)]-beta-D- glucuronopyranosyl barringtogenol C; barringtoside B, 3-O-beta-D-xylopyranosyl(1-->3)-]beta-D-galactopyranosyl(1-->2)]-beta-D- glucuronopyranosyl-21-O-tigloyl-28-O-isobutyryl barringtogenol C; barringtoside C, 3-O-alpha-L-arabinopyranosyl(1-->3)-[beta-D-galactopyranosyl(1-->2 )]-beta-D - glucuronopyranosyl barringtogenol C.

Photos

References

External links

acutangula
Ericales of Australia
Eudicots of Western Australia
Flora of the Northern Territory
Flora of Queensland
Flora of Afghanistan
Flora of tropical Asia
Mangroves